Margaret is a Polish singer and songwriter. She rose to prominence after the release of her debut single, "Thank You Very Much" (2013), which charted in the top 30 in Italy, the top 40 in Austria and the top 50 in Germany, and was the third best-selling digital single of 2013 in Poland by a Polish artist. The song was later included on Margaret's first extended play (EP) All I Need, which was released in July 2013 and peaked at number 50 in Poland.

Her debut studio album, Add the Blonde, released in August 2014, contained all songs from All I Need and eight new tracks. It reached number eight in the Polish charts and was certified platinum by the Polish Society of the Phonographic Industry (ZPAV). The album yielded three singles, "Wasted"  (2014), "Start a Fire" (2014) and "Heartbeat" (2015), released exclusively in Poland. "Wasted" and "Start a Fire" reached the top 10 in the Polish Airplay Chart, while "Heartbeat" charted within its top 20. The foremost was later also released in Scandinavia. Margaret's second studio album, Just the Two of Us (2015), recorded in collaboration with Canadian jazz singer Matt Dusk, consisted of jazz standards. The album reached the top 30 on the Polish albums chart, and received a platinum certification from ZPAV. It was promoted by two singles, the title track and the song "'Deed I Do". In December 2016, Margaret re-released her debut album. The reissue spawned two singles: "Cool Me Down" and "Elephant". The former became Margaret's first Polish top five single, and also charted in the top 40 in Sweden. Moreover, it was certified two-times platinum in Poland and gold in Sweden. "Elephant" peaked at number 21 in Poland.

In 2017, Margaret released her third studio album, Monkey Business, which reached number eight on the Polish Albums Chart. Its singles, "What You Do" and "Byle jak" ("Anyhow"), charted at numbers 14 and six in Poland, respectively. She followed this with her Melodifestivalen entries, "In My Cabana" (2018) and "Tempo" (2019). "In My Cabana" reached number three in Poland and number eight in Sweden, while "Tempo" charted at number seven in Poland and at number 43 in Sweden. Her first Polish-language album (fourth overall), Gaja Hornby, was released in 2019 and placed at number 13 on the Polish albums chart. It spawned the singles "Gaja Hornby", "Serce Baila", "Chwile bez słów" (featuring Kacezet), and "Ej chłopaku". Margaret's fifth studio album, Maggie Vision (2021), debuted at number five in Poland, and yielded nine singles including the ZPAV-certified "Reksiu" (featuring Otsochodzi) and "Roadster" (featuring Kizo). Its follow-up EP, Gelato (2021), spawned the single "Tak na oko", which peaked within the top 20 in Poland.

Margaret also released few non-album singles throughout her career, including "O mnie się nie martw" ("Don't You Worry About Me"; 2014), a theme song of the Polish television series of the same name, "Smak radości" ("The Taste of Happiness"; 2015), and "Coraz bliżej święta" ("Holidays are Coming"; 2015). The last two songs were recorded for Polish Coca-Cola television commercials. "Coraz bliżej święta" peaked at number 29 in Poland. Aside from her solo work, Margaret featured on the singles "Let It Snow!" (2016) from Old School Yule! by Matt Dusk and "Układanki" (2019) from Skan myśli by Polish rapper Young Igi, and provided vocals for non-album singles "6 in the Morning" (2017) by Swedish music group VAX and "Błogość" (2019) by Polish musician Kacezet.

Albums

Studio albums

EPs

Singles

2010s

2020s

Songwriting credits

Music videos

See also
List of songs recorded by Margaret

Notes

References

Discographies of Polish artists
Margaret (singer)
Pop music discographies